List of countries by homicide rate by decade per year per 100,000 inhabitants. The reliability of underlying national homicide rate data may vary. Homicide demographics are affected by changes in trauma care, leading to changed lethality of violent assaults, so the homicide rate may not necessarily indicate the overall level of societal violence.

1900s

1910s

1920s

1930s

1940s

1950s

1960s

1970s

1980s

1990s

2000s

2010s

References

Homicide rate
Country
Rate

ar:قائمة الدول حسب معدل جرائم القتل
ru:Список стран по уровню убийств